The Maritime Junior Hockey League (MHL) is a Junior A ice hockey league under Hockey Canada, a part of the Canadian Junior Hockey League. It consists of five teams from New Brunswick and one team from Prince Edward Island, which make up the EastLink North Division (formerly Roger Meek), and six teams from Nova Scotia which make up the Eastlink South Division. The winner of the MHL playoffs competes for the Fred Page Cup against the winners of the Quebec Junior AAA Hockey League and the Central Junior A Hockey League. The winner of the Fred Page Cup then moves on to compete for the Canadian National Junior A Championship, formerly known as the Royal Bank Cup.

History
Originally known as the Metro Valley Junior Hockey League, the league was founded in 1967 by Fred McGillivray and Louie Lewis of Halifax, Nova Scotia and Don Stewart of Berwick, Nova Scotia as a Junior "B" level hockey league.  Originally an exclusively Nova Scotia hockey league, it included six teams: East Hants Junior Penguins, Halifax Colonels, Dartmouth Hoyts, Windsor Royals, Kentville Riteways, and Berwick Shell Juniors.  1968 saw the Truro Bearcats and Amherst Ramblers replace the teams from Kentville and Berwick.  In 1971–72 the New Glasgow Bombers and the Pictou Maripacs entered the league. Stellarton and a new Kentville franchise entered the league in 1973 and 1974 respectively.

In 1977, still known as the "Metro Valley", the league entered into the Tier II Junior "A" level.  The jump to Junior "A" was, in theory, to be a catalyst for the development of the league.  However The budgets necessary to play at the Jr. 'A' level resulted in the immediate withdrawal of the Chester Ravens and the East Hants Penguins. The Cole Harbour Colts (Scotia Colts), who entered the league in 1976, became the first team in league history to host the national championship, then known as the Centennial Cup, in 1980.

The 1983 season saw the addition of the expansion Moncton Midland Hawks of Moncton, New Brunswick, the league's first non-Nova Scotia team.  The Hawks came from the New Brunswick Junior Hockey League and are now known as the Edmundston Blizzard.  In 1986, the league expanded to Antigonish and the Scotia Colts, again, hosted the Centennial Cup.  The Summerside Western Capitals of the Island Junior Hockey League, Prince Edward Island's junior hockey league, hosted the 1989 Centennial Cup.

In 1991, Summerside and Charlottetown of Prince Edward Island left the IJHL and joined the newly dubbed "Maritime Junior A Hockey League".  The IJHL is still PEI's premier Junior league, but now is only a Junior "B" league.  The winner of the IJHL's playoffs compete for the Don Johnson Cup, the Maritime Junior "B" Championship.

For the 1996–97 season, the league added the Cape Breton Islanders and Restigouche River Rats. In 1996–97 the league consisted of the Amherst Ramblers, Antigonish Bulldogs, Charlottetown Abbies, East Hants Penguins, Dartmouth Oland Exports, Moncton Gagnon Beavers, Saint John Alpines, and Summerside Western Capitals. The Saint John Alpines folded in January.  With financial losses totalling $40,000 and an additional $50,000 shortfall projected should the team finish the season, they simply ran out of money. The Summerside Western Capitals won the league's first ever national title. The Capitals hosted the Royal Bank Cup at Cahill Stadium and won the championship game 4–3 over the South Surrey Eagles.

Truro and Bathurst received approval for new teams to start in 1997–98 but due to the relocation of the Quebec Major Junior Hockey League's Laval Titan to Bathurst, the Truro Bearcats would be the sole new team. The Cape Breton Islanders moved to Glace Bay and became the Glace Bay Miners, but with the arrival of the Quebec Major Junior Hockey League's Cape Breton Screaming Eagles, they folded in December of that season, leaving the league with nine teams again.

During the 1998–99 season two teams changed their names. The first was the Dartmouth Oland Exports when they moved to the Halifax Forum to become the Halifax Oland Exports. The second was the 1998–99 MJAHL champions, the Restigouche River Rats, as they changed their name to the Campbellton Tigers.

A tenth team was added for the 2000–01 season, the Miramichi Timberwolves. At the same time, the East Hants Penguins moved to Dartmouth and became the Scotia Dairy Queen Blizzard. At the end of the 2001–02 season, the league approved the transfer of the Blizzard to Yarmouth. The Yarmouth Motormart Mariners began play in September 2002. In early 2003 the league governors approved expansion into Woodstock, N.B., with the Slammers beginning play in the 2003–04 season.

The league hired its first professional full-time league president in 2003, Vernon Doyle.

The league got their second national Championship when the Halifax Oland Exports won the 2002 Royal Bank Cup on home ice. One year later, after financial trouble with Oland Brewery, the franchise's name was changed to Halifax Team Pepsi. In the spring of 2004, the Weeks Hockey Organization bought the club, moved it to New Glasgow and renamed it the Pictou County Weeks Crushers. On that same day Halifax was granted an expansion franchise, the Halifax Wolverines.

In the spring of 2008, the MJAHL had some big changes.

On April 15, the Antigonish Bulldogs announced that they were applying for a leave of absence for one year. On April 26, the Bulldogs had to choose between two groups trying to buy the team and relocate it. The first group would move the franchise to New Richmond, Quebec. The other group would relocate the team to the Halifax area. At the Board of Governors meeting that day, the proposal to relocate the Antigonish franchise to New Richmond, Quebec was not considered to be in the best interests of the league and its members. The Governors did leave the door open to the sale to a Halifax group and a move to Metro Halifax. The sale and relocation of the franchise to Halifax was later approved.

At the same Governors meeting, in response to the decision to leave the door open on the sale of the Bulldogs, the owners of the Halifax Wolverines announced their plans to move to Bridgewater. The Governors voted on the decision and it was approved. Following a name the team contest, the franchise was dubbed the Bridgewater Lumberjacks.

Later that week on April 29, the Moncton Beavers announced that they had failed to come to terms on a new lease for the Tim Hortons 4-Ice centre and had subsequently moved themselves to the neighboring city of Dieppe. The team was renamed the Dieppe Commandos.

Rounding out this very busy month in the history of the MJAHL was the Charlottetown Abbies' decision on May 1 to apply for a leave of absence for one year, which was accepted.

The Halifax franchise (former Antigonish Bulldogs) announced on August 22 that the club would be known as the Halifax Lions. This was the name of the successful Halifax team in the 1980s.

In 2010, the MJAHL changed its name to the Maritime Junior Hockey League and unveiled a new logo.

In 2011, the Halifax Lions moved to Dartmouth and were renamed the Metro Marauders. Two years later the Marauders were renamed the Metro Shipbuilders for the 2012–13 season. That season was a disaster for the Shipbuilders, as they only recorded four wins in their 52-game schedule and averaged just 232 fans per game. The relocation rumours had them moving back to Halifax after three years in Dartmouth but they finally moved to Kentville and were renamed the Valley Wildcats. After one season in Kentville they moved to Berwick.

In 2014 the league approved an expansion team in St. Stephen named the County Aces. As a result of the expansion, the league was back up to 12 teams for the first time since the folding of the Charlottetown Abbies in April 2008.

In November 2014, the league took over the ownership of the Bridgewater Lumberjacks after owner Ken Petrie left the team because of financial trouble. The team was sold two weeks later to a local businessman and the team was renamed the South Shore Lumberjacks.

In November 2016, the Dieppe Commandos announced they would be moving to Edmundston, New Brunswick after the 2016–17 season, and be renamed the Edmundston Blizzard.

In May 2018, the Woodstock Slammers applied for a leave of absence for the 2018–19 season; the team is later sold and relocated to Grand Falls, New Brunswick and renamed the Grand Falls Rapids.

In April 2019, the St. Stephen Aces were sold to a group from Fredericton, New Brunswick and became the third team in three years to relocate. The Aces  relocated to Fredericton, New Brunswick for the 2019–20 season and were renamed the Fredericton Red Wings.
 
The current MHL has twelve teams, six in each division. The league has hosted the Royal Bank Cup and Centennial Cup seven times, winning twice. MHL teams have also won seven Fred Page Cups as the Junior "A" Eastern Canadian champions to earn the right to compete for the Royal Bank Cup.

Teams

*relocated franchise

League champions

From the 1970s until 1991, the Callaghan Cup was the Atlantic Junior A Championship of Canada.  The winners of New Brunswick, Prince Edward Island, Nova Scotia, and Newfoundland would playdown for this trophy during the Dudley Hewitt Cup and Manitoba Centennial Cup playdowns.

In 1991, the Callaghan Cup became exclusive to the MJAHL.  The Callaghan Cup was their championship trophy until after the 2006 playoffs, when it was replaced by the Kent Cup,

In the Kent Cup era the bold team indicates the Kent Cup winner.

Fred Page Cup Eastern Canadian Champions
All champions in this table are from the Maritime Junior Hockey League

Callaghan Cup MVJHL Champions
All champions in this table are from the Metro Valley Junior Hockey League against interleague opponents.

Defunct teams
Cape Breton Islanders/Glace Bay Miners
Charlottetown Abbies
Dartmouth Arrows/Eagles/Fuel Kids/Pepsis
Kentville Colonels
Saint John Alpines
Truro Bearcats (1977–1983) (Joined MJAHL again in 1997 with new franchise)
Valley Wildcats (1980–1984) (Awarded new team after the relocation of the Metro Shipbuilders)
Windsor Royals
Mount Denson Rangers

Timeline of teams in the MHL
1967 – Metro Valley Junior Hockey League is founded at Junior B level
1967 – East Hants Junior Penguins, Halifax Colonels, Dartmouth Hoyts Arrows, Windsor Royals, Kentville Riteway Rangers, and Berwick Shell Junior Bruins are founding members of the league.
1968 – Kentville Riteway Rangers move to Truro and are renamed the Truro Bearcats
1968 – Berwick Shell Junior Bruins move to Amherst and are renamed the Amherst Ramblers
1969 – The Halifax Colonels become the Halifax Blazers sometime between the inaugural season and the 1972–73 season.
1972 – Chester Ravens enter league?
1972 – New Glasgow Bombers enter league
1972 – Pictou Maripacs enter league
1973 – Stellarton Spitfires join league
1974 – Kentville Colonels join league
1975 – Stellarton Spitfires leave league
1975 – Pictou Maripacs leave league
1975 – Halifax Blazers are renamed Halifax Centennials
1976 – Cole Harbour Colts join league
1976 – New Glasgow Bombers leave league
1977 – League is promoted to Junior A
1977 – East Hantz Penguins leave league
1977 – Chester Ravens leave league but franchise is demoted to Jr. B in 1980
1977 – Halifax Centennials are renamed Halifax Lions
1978 – Windsor Royals expelled from league mid-season for short roster
1980 – Kentville Colonels leave league
1980 – Valley Wildcats join league
1983 – Truro Bearcats fold mid-season (November)
1983 – Moncton Hawks join league from New Brunswick Junior Hockey League
1984 – Valley Wildcats leave league
1986 – Antigonish Bulldogs join league
1987 – Dartmouth Arrows renamed Dartmouth Fuel Kids
1988 – Dartmouth Fuel Kids renamed Dartmouth Eagles
1989 – Dartmouth Eagles renamed Dartmouth Pepsis
1989 – Halifax Lions renamed Halifax DQ Blizzards
1990 – Moncton Hawks renamed Moncton Classics
1990 – Halifax DQ Blizzards renamed Halifax Canadians
1991 – Metro Valley Junior Hockey League is renamed Maritime Junior A Hockey League
1991 – Charlottetown Abbies join league from Island Junior Hockey League
1991 - Summerside Western Capitals join league from Island Junior Hockey League
1991 – Halifax Canadians renamed Halifax Mooseheads
1991 – Moncton Classics renamed Moncton-Dieppe Classics
1992 – Dartmouth Pepsis leave league
1993 – Moncton-Dieppe Classics become Moncton-Dieppe Beavers
1993 – Halifax Mooseheads renamed Halifax Oland Exports
1994 – Moncton-Dieppe Beavers renamed Moncton Beavers
1994 – Amherst Ramblers renamed Amherst Mooseheads
1994 – Charlottetown Abbies take one-year leave
1995 – Charlottetown Abbies return to league
1995 – Saint John Alpines join league
1995 – Halifax Oland Exports move to Dartmouth and are renamed Dartmouth Oland Exports
1995 – Cole Harbour Colts move to East Hants and are renamed East Hants Penguins
1996 – Restigouche River Rats join league
1996 – Cape Breton Islanders join league
1997 – Saint John Alpines fold mid-season (January)
1997 – Truro Bearcats join league
1997 – Cape Breton Islanders renamed Glace Bay Miners
1997 – Glace Bay Miners fold mid-season (December)
1998 – Dartmouth Oland Exports move to Halifax and are renamed Halifax Oland Exports
1998 – Amherst Mooseheads renamed Amherst Ramblers
1999 – Restigouche River Rats renamed Campbellton Tigers
2000 – Miramichi Timberwolves join league
2000 – East Hants Penguins move to Dartmouth and are renamed Dartmouth DQ Blizzard
2002 – Dartmouth DQ Blizzard move from Dartmouth and renamed Yarmouth Mariners
2003 – Halifax Oland Exports renamed Halifax Team Pepsi
2003 – Woodstock Slammers join league
2004 – Halifax Team Pepsi move from Halifax to New Glasgow and renamed Pictou County Weeks Crushers
2004 – Halifax Wolverines join league
2005 – Campbellton Tigers change their name to Restigouche Tigers
2008 – Charlottetown Abbies take one-year leave 
2008 – Halifax Wolverines move from Halifax to Bridgewater and are renamed Bridgewater Lumberjacks
2008 – Antigonish Bulldogs move from Antigonish to Halifax and are renamed Halifax Lions
2008 – Moncton Beavers move from Moncton to Dieppe and are renamed Dieppe Commandos
2009 – Restigouche Tigers renamed Campbellton Tigers
2009 – Charlottetown Abbies fail to return to league
2010 – Halifax Lions move from Halifax to Darmouth and are renamed Metro Marauders (Dartmouth)
2010 – Maritime Junior A Hockey League changes their name to Maritime Junior Hockey League
2012 – Metro Marauders renamed the Metro Shipbuilders
2013 – Metro Shipbuilders move from Dartmouth to Kentville and renamed the Valley Wildcats.
2014 – Valley Wildcats move from Kentville to Berwick
2014 – County Aces joined league
2014 – Bridgewater Lumberjacks renamed South Shore Lumberjacks
2017 – Dieppe Commandos move from Dieppe to Edmundston and are renamed Edmundston Blizzard
2018 – Woodstock Slammers request "leave of absence". Franchise instead re-located to Grand Falls, NB and were renamed the Rapids
2019 – St. Stephen Aces move from St. Stephen to Fredericton and are renamed the Fredericton Red Wings.

Bolded teams indicate the original names of active franchises.

External links
MHL Website
CJHL Website

References

 
Ice hockey leagues in Prince Edward Island
Ice hockey leagues in Nova Scotia
Ice hockey leagues in New Brunswick
A
Canadian Junior Hockey League members
Organizations based in Nova Scotia
Truro, Nova Scotia